Bereichsleiter (Department Leader) was a Nazi Party political rank which existed between the years of 1939 and 1945.  The rank of Bereichsleiter was created primarily to replace the older rank of Kreisleiter (County Leader) but was also used on higher levels of the Nazi Party (Regional and National) as a senior Chief of Staff position.

Those Bereichsleiters who were assigned to the position Kreisleiter were now denoted through the use of a special political armband.

Bereichleites were often given military denotation titles in reserve regional army's under various party branches. The enlightenment was one example of a branch used, typically in dual titles between senior general staff.

Sources
 Clark, J. (2007). Uniforms of the NSDAP. Atglen, PA: Schiffer Publishing

Nazi political ranks